Saddam: The Secret Life is a book by Con Coughlin. It tells the story of Iraqi dictator, Saddam Hussein, and his career.

Saddam Hussein
Biographies about politicians